Silvanoprus scuticollis is a species of silvanid flat bark beetle in the family Silvanidae. It is found in Africa, the Caribbean, Central America, North America, South America, Southern Asia, and Europe.

References

Further reading

 
 

Silvanidae
Articles created by Qbugbot
Beetles described in 1859